Uqi Salli Punta (Quechua uqi lead, salli sulfur, also spelled Okhe Salli Punta) is a  mountain in the Bolivian Andes. It is located in the Cochabamba Department, on the border of the Chapare Province, Villa Tunari Municipality, and the Quillacollo Province, Quillacollo Municipality.

References 

Mountains of Cochabamba Department